The 2nd Indian Cavalry Division was a division of the British Indian Army formed at the outbreak of World War I.  It served on the Western Front, being renamed as 5th Cavalry Division on 26 November 1916.  In March 1918, the 5th Cavalry Division was broken up. The British and Canadian units remained in France and the Indian elements were sent to Egypt to help constitute 2nd Mounted Division.

History
The division sailed for France from Bombay on 16 October 1914, under the command of Major General G A Cookson. During the war the division would serve in the trenches as infantry. Due to the difference on troop levels each cavalry brigade, once dismounted, formed a dismounted regiment.

In March 1916 the 2nd Indian Cavalry Division was attached to the British Fourth Army.
On 1 July 1916 the 9th (Secunderabad) Cavalry Brigade moved into a reserve position on the Somme, ready to exploit any breakthrough. The same brigade was sent up again on 14 July, to Montauban to support the attack on the Bazentin – Longueval ridge. At 17.30 the leading two regiments were ordered to advance between High Wood and Delville Wood.
The British 7th Dragoon Guards and the Indian 20th Deccan Horse galloped forward to a position between the woods, but little could be achieved. At 03.30 on 15 July, they returned to Montauban, having suffered casualties of 74 men and 110 horses. Cavalry units were again brought forward on 15 September to support the attack on Flers-Courcelette, but were not drawn into the fighting and played no further part in the Battle of the Somme except as labour units in reserve.
The high number of officer casualties suffered early on had an effect on its later performance. British officers that understood the language, customs, and psychology of their men could not be quickly replaced, and the alien environment of the Western Front had some effect on the soldiers.
The 2nd Indian Cavalry Division was renamed the 5th Cavalry Division on 26 November 1916 and attached to the 5th Army. In March 1918 the division was transferred to Egypt, although its two British regular cavalry regiments (8th Hussars and 7th Dragoon Guards) remained in France.

Order of battle
5th (Mhow) Cavalry Brigade (left on 15 September 1915 for 1st Indian Cavalry Division)
 6th (Inniskilling) Dragoons
 2nd Lancers (Gardner's Horse)
 38th King George's Own Central India Horse
 X Battery, Royal Horse Artillery

7th (Meerut) Cavalry Brigade (left in June 1916 for Mesopotamia)

 13th Hussars
 3rd Skinner's Horse
 18th King George's Own Tiwana Lancers (transferred in June 1916 to 3rd (Ambala) Cavalry Brigade)
 30th Lancers (Gordon's Horse) (joined in June 1916 from 3rd (Ambala) Cavalry Brigade)
 V Battery, Royal Horse Artillery 
 15th Machine Gun Squadron (joined in February 1916)

9th (Secunderabad) Cavalry Brigade

 7th (Princess Royal's) Dragoon Guards
 20th Deccan Horse
 34th Prince Albert Victor's Own Poona Horse
 N Battery, Royal Horse Artillery
 13th Machine Gun Squadron (joined on 29 February 1916)

3rd (Ambala) Cavalry Brigade (joined on 15 September 1915 from 1st Indian Cavalry Division)

 8th (King's Royal Irish) Hussars
 9th Hodson's Horse
 30th Lancers (Gordon's Horse) (transferred in June 1916 to 7th (Meerut) Cavalry Brigade)
 18th King George's Own Lancers (joined in June 1916 from 7th (Meerut) Cavalry Brigade)
 X Battery, Royal Horse Artillery
 14th Machine Gun Squadron (joined on 29 February 1916)

Canadian Cavalry Brigade (joined on 17 June 1916 from 3rd Cavalry Division)
 Royal Canadian Dragoons
 Lord Strathcona's Horse
 Fort Garry Horse
 Royal Canadian Horse Artillery Brigade (A and B Batteries, RCHA)
 Canadian Cavalry Brigade Machine Gun Squadron

II Indian Brigade, Royal Horse Artillery (XVII Brigade, Royal Horse Artillery from 26 November 1916)
 N Battery, Royal Horse Artillery (with 9th (Secunderabad) Cavalry Brigade)
 X Battery, Royal Horse Artillery (with 7th (Meerut) Cavalry Brigade, to Mesopotamia with brigade)
 X Battery, Royal Horse Artillery (with 5th (Mhow) Cavalry Brigade then 3rd (Ambala) Cavalry Brigade)
 II Indian RHA Brigade Ammunition Column

See also

 British cavalry during the First World War
 List of Indian divisions in World War I

References

Bibliography

External links
 

British Indian Army divisions
Indian World War I divisions
Military units and formations established in 1914
Military units and formations disestablished in 1918
British cavalry divisions
1914 establishments in India